The 1976–77 Boise State Broncos men's basketball team represented Boise State University during the 1976–77 NCAA Division I men's basketball season. The Broncos were led by fourth-year head coach Bus Connor and played their home games on campus at Bronco Gymnasium in Boise, Idaho.

No Broncos were named to the all-conference team; junior guard Steve Connor was on the second team, and forward Danny Jones was honorable mention.

References

External links
Sports Reference – Boise State Broncos – 1976–77 basketball season

Boise State Broncos men's basketball seasons
Boise State
Boise State